Hits is a greatest hits collection by the English rock band Pulp, released in November 2002.

Background
As a collection, Hits only covers Pulp's singles from the early 1990s when they hit the mainstream, although the band had existed in one form or another since 1978.

Hits includes all of Pulp's A-sides released from "Babies" in 1992 to "Bad Cover Version" in 2002, with the exception of "Mis-Shapes" from Different Class, apparently because, by the time the compilation was released, the band could no longer stand the song. In its place is "Underwear", an album track from Different Class.

The tracklisting is ordered chronologically by release date, with the exception of Pulp's last single "Bad Cover Version", which instead appears between "The Trees" and "Sunrise" (the latter two tracks having originally been released together as a double A-side single).

Two other singles, "Common People" and "Disco 2000", are presented in their Different Class album mixes rather than their more familiar (but since deleted) "hit" single versions.

The first and second singles, "Babies" and "Razzmatazz", were originally released on Pulp's previous record label, Gift Records. The rest of the singles were released after the band signed to Island Records.

The band were contractually obligated to record a new song for inclusion on Hits. The resulting song, "Last Day of the Miners' Strike", appears as the last track on the album. It contains a sample of "South American Getaway" by Burt Bacharach, and refers to the UK miner's strike of 1984–1985.

An accompanying DVD was also released under the same title, featuring the band's promotional videos from the same era, a number of live performances, documentaries and short movies.

Track listing

CD

Note: "Underwear" appears on the UK version of the album only – however it is listed in error on the sleeve of the Canadian version.

DVD

Short films
''Do You Remember the First Time? (documentary)
"Babies" (spoken word version)
This Is Hardcore (documentary)

Home movies
TV Madness
Sheffield Bands
Home Movies
Catcliffe

Personnel
Ed Buller – producer (tracks: 1 to 4), mixing (tracks: 1, 3, 4)
Chris Thomas – producer (tracks: 5 to 13)
Scott Walker – producer (tracks: 14 to 16)
Peter Walsh – co-producer (tracks: 14 to 16)
Cameron Craig – producer (track 17)
Tim Burrell – mastering
Jarvis Cocker – art direction
Peter Saville – art direction
Simon Periton – cover image
Howard Wakefield – design
Willie Seldon – photography

Certifications

References

External links

Hits at YouTube (streamed copy where licensed)

Pulp (band) albums
Pulp (band) video albums
2002 compilation albums
2002 video albums
Music video compilation albums
Island Records compilation albums
Island Records video albums